Paula T. Dow (born 1955) served as the 58th Attorney General of New Jersey, appointed by incoming Governor Chris Christie. Her nomination to a full term was confirmed by the New Jersey Senate in February 2010. She is the first African-American woman to be attorney general in state history.

On December 12, 2011, Christie announced that Dow would temporarily become the First Deputy General Counsel for the Port Authority of New York and New Jersey and that he had nominated Jeffrey S. Chiesa, then Christie's chief counsel, to become the new Attorney General. The governor also said he would file a notice of intent to nominate Dow to a Superior Court judgeship in Essex County. Chiesa was sworn in as Dow's successor on January 10, 2012.

Biography

Dow was raised in Yeadon, Pennsylvania outside of Philadelphia. She graduated from Franklin & Marshall College with a B.A. degree in 1977. In 1978 she worked as a summer associate for the Camden law firm Tomar, Parks, Seliger, Simonoff & Adourian. She received her J.D. degree  from the University of Pennsylvania Law School in 1980. From 1980 to 1987 she worked as a lawyer for Exxon in Texas, New Jersey and New York, advising on environmental and labor issues.

Dow joined the office of the United States District Court for the Southern District of New York in 1987, working in the Civil Division until 1994. She then moved to the office of the United States Attorney for the District of New Jersey, working there from 1994 to 2003. From 2002 to 2003 she served as counsel to U.S. Attorney Chris Christie.

In 2003, Dow was nominated by Governor Jim McGreevey to be Essex County Prosecutor. She was opposed by some local leaders, such as Newark Mayor Sharpe James.  State senators from Essex County blocked her confirmation, saying that they had not been consulted by McGreevey on the appointment. After serving as Acting Prosecutor for two years, she was sworn in as Prosecutor in June 2005 by Governor Richard Codey.

On December 15, 2009, in his first cabinet announcement, then-Governor-elect Chris Christie nominated Dow as Attorney General of New Jersey. She became Acting Attorney General on January 19, 2010. On February 8, the Senate Judiciary Committee unanimously approved her nomination to a full term.  The full Senate unanimously confirmed her nomination on February 22, and she was sworn in the following day.  In 2011, Governor Chris Christie named Dow to a position at the Port Authority of New York and New Jersey.  In 2012, a New Jersey Senate Committee approved Governor Christie's nomination of Dow to a judgeship on the Superior Court.  Dow became a judge in the Family Court Division in Burlington County, where she sat until December 2015, when she was assigned to the General Equity Part.

Dow lives in Maplewood and is a single mother of two.

See also
List of female state attorneys general in the United States

References

External links
Official bio, Office of the Attorney General of New Jersey

1955 births
Living people
Franklin & Marshall College alumni
University of Pennsylvania Law School alumni
District attorneys in New Jersey
African-American women lawyers
American women lawyers
American lawyers
African-American lawyers
New Jersey Attorneys General
New Jersey Democrats
People from Maplewood, New Jersey
People from Yeadon, Pennsylvania
21st-century African-American people
21st-century African-American women
20th-century African-American people
20th-century African-American women